Guy de Montfort, Count of Nola (1244–1291) was the son of Simon de Montfort, 6th Earl of Leicester and Eleanor of England.

Biography
He participated in the Battle of Evesham against the royalist forces of his uncle, King Henry III of England, and his cousin, Prince Edward. Both his father and elder brother were traumatically killed during the disastrous battle. Guy de Montfort was seriously wounded and captured.

He was held at Windsor Castle until spring 1266, when he bribed his captors and escaped to France to rejoin his exiled family. Guy and his brother, Simon the Younger, wandered across Europe for several years, eventually making their way to Italy.

Guy took service with Charles of Anjou, serving as his Vicar-General in Tuscany. 
He distinguished himself at the Battle of Tagliacozzo and was given Nola by Charles of Anjou.

In 1271, Guy and Simon discovered that their cousin Henry of Almain (son of Richard, Earl of Cornwall) was in Viterbo at the church of San Silvestro. In revenge for the deaths of their father and brother at Evesham, on 13 March 1271, Guy and Simon murdered Henry while he clutched the altar, begging for mercy. "You had no mercy for my father and brothers", was Guy's reply. This murder was carried out in the presence of the Cardinals (who were conducting a papal Election), of King Philip III of France, and of King Charles of Sicily. For this crime the Montfort brothers were excommunicated, and Dante banished Guy to the river of boiling blood in the seventh circle of his Inferno (Canto XII).

The news reached England, and King Henry III dispatched a clerk of the royal household to inform the northern counties and Scotland about the excommunication. Pope Gregory X wrote a letter (29 November 1273) to King Edward from Lyons, where he was preparing for an ecumenical council, that Cardinal Riccardo Annibaldi and Cardinal Giovanni Orsini were still in Rome and had been ordered to find a secure place of imprisonment in the territories of the Church for Guy de Montfort.

Simon died later that year at Siena, "cursed by God, a wanderer and a fugitive". 
Guy was stripped of his titles and took service with Charles of Anjou again, but was captured off the coast of Sicily in 1287 by the Aragonese at the Battle of the Counts. 
He died in a Sicilian prison.

Family
In Tuscany, he married an Italian noblewoman, Margherita Aldobrandesca, the Lady of Sovana. 
With her he had two daughters: Anastasia, who married Romano Orsini, and Tomasina, who married Pietro di Vico.

Notes

Sources

Maddicott, J.R. Simon de Montfort, 1996

1244 births
1288 deaths
Guy
People excommunicated by the Catholic Church
13th-century English people
Escapees from England and Wales detention
English escapees
English people who died in prison custody
English people imprisoned abroad
Younger sons of earls
Prisoners who died in Aragonese detention